Enallagma anna, the river bluet, is a species of narrow-winged damselfly in the family Coenagrionidae. It is found in southern Canada and western and northeastern United States.

The IUCN conservation status of Enallagma anna is "least concern", with no immediate threat to the species' survival. The population is stable.

References

Further reading

 

Coenagrionidae
Odonata of North America
Insects of Canada
Insects of the United States
Insects described in 1900
Articles created by Qbugbot